Knudson is a surname. Notable people with the surname include a long-standing Danish family with ties to the Supreme Court, as well as West Point and the Missouri/Arkansas State Court.

People
Albert C. Knudson (1873–1954), Christian theologian in the Methodist tradition, associated with Boston University
Alfred G. Knudson M.D., Ph.D. (1922–2016), geneticist specializing in cancer genetics
Barbara Knudson (1927–2014), American film and television actress
Dave Knudson (guitarist) plays guitar with Seattle-based indie band Minus the Bear
Dave Knudson (politician) (born 1950), American lawyer, South Dakota Senator, and a member of the Republican Party
Dean Knudson (born 1961), the Mayor of Hudson, Wisconsin
Emery T. Knudson (1896–1974), Chief Justice of the Idaho Supreme Court
George Knudson, CM (1937–1989), Canadian professional golfer
Guido Knudson (born 1989), American former professional baseball pitcher
Harvey B. Knudson (1903–1978), Justice on the North Dakota Supreme Court from 1965 to 1975
Lewis Knudson (1884–1958), American botanist
Mark Knudson (born 1960), former right-handed pitcher in Major League Baseball
Milton L. Knudson (1923–1942), United States Navy sailor who received the Navy and Marine Corps Medal during World War II
Norman Knudson (1874–1934), member of the Wisconsin State Senate
Olaf Knudson (1915–1996), Norwegian politician for the Conservative Party
Peter C. Knudson, American politician and Orthodontist from Utah
Robert Knudson (1925–2006), American sound engineer
Ruthann Knudson (1941–2018), American archaeologist
Tom Knudson, (born 1953), American journalist and a two-time Pulitzer Prize winner in 1985 and 1992
Wendy Knudson or Wendy Koenig (born 1955), American middle-distance runner

Ships
USS Knudson (DE-591), a United States Navy destroyer escort converted during construction into the high-speed transport USS Knudson (APD-101)
USS Knudson (APD-101), United States Navy high-speed transport in commission from 1944 to 1946 and from 1953 to 1958

See also
Knudson hypothesis, the hypothesis that cancer is the result of accumulated mutations to a cell's DNA
Justice Knudson (disambiguation)
Knudson Brothers Building, historic two-story commercial building in Brigham City, Utah
Jonathan and Jennie Knudson House, historic house in Brigham City, Utah
Knudsen (disambiguation)